Scandiweb is a Latvian Digital strategy and Web development company specialized in Magento platform. The company was established in 2003 in Latvia by Antons Sapriko. It has offices in the United States, the UK, Sweden, Norway, France and Canada. It provides eCommerce solutions and acts as a strategic partner for IT development focusing on web, mobile, and big data analysis. Their work is primarily centered around Magento but also includes 3rd party integration, OroCRM integration, performance optimization and security services.

Partnerships
Since October 2016, Scandiweb have been partnering with Oro, Inc., an open-source business application development firm, to create an integrated E-commerce CRM solution based on the synthesis of Magento and Oro’s proprietary OroCRM system.

Accolade
In December 2016, Scandiweb constructed the world’s largest Rube Goldberg Machine and entered the Guinness Book of World Records. The machine was used to turn on the lights on Riga’s Christmas tree. The Rube Goldberg deployed a chain reaction consisting of 412 mechanical steps, setting in motion a wide assortment of parts such as levers, balls and wheels, as well as items like a coffee machine and a fan. The principle of a Rube Goldberg Machine is to achieve a simple task in the most complicated way possible.

References

Web development
Software companies of Latvia
Companies of Latvia